Valérie Nicolas (born 12 March 1975) is a French handball goalkeeper and former player of the French national team. She became World Champion in 2003 with the French team, and was also voted Most Valuable Player and Best Goalkeeper. She was voted into the All-Star Team in the 2007 World Championship. Among her other triumphs are a silver medal from the World Championships, two bronze medals from the European Championships, victories at the Champions League, the EHF Cup, the Cup Winners' Cup, and both French and Danish national championships.

Club career 
Nicolas was born in Lampaul-Guimiliau, Finistère, and started her professional career in USM Gagny. From 1995 to 2003 she played for top club ES Besançon. With Besançon she won the French Championship in 1998 and in 2001, and the French Cup in 2001 and 2002. In 2003, she won the French Championship, the French Cup and the Cup Winners' Cup. After this successful season, she moved to Denmark to play for Viborg HK. She stayed at Viborg from 2003 to 2007, winning two Danish Championships (in 2004 and 2006), two Danish Cups, the Champions League in 2006 and the EHF Cup in 2004. She then played for Ikast/Bording EH one season, 2007/08, before returning to France to play for N2 (French fourth division) club ASPTT Nice.

National team 
Nicolas made her debut on the French national team in 1995. Until her retirement from the national team in 2008 (after the Summer Olympics), Valérie Nicolas played 234 international matches. In 1997 she finishted 10th at the World Championship. She won a silver medal at the 1999 World Championship, after a final match between France and Norway in Lillehammer, which needed two overtimes to break the tie, ending 25-24 to Norway. In 2000, she finished 6th at the Olympics in Sydney, and 5th at the European Championship. She finished fifth at the 2001 World Championship with the French team, and won a bronze medal at the 2002 European Women's Handball Championship. She won a gold medal with the French team at the 2003 World Championship, and was voted Most Valuable Player and All-Star Team goalkeeper at the championship. At the 2004 Summer Olympics in Athens she finished fourth with the national team. She finished 12th at the 2005 World Championship in Russia, and won a bronze medal at the 2006 European Women's Handball Championship. At the 2007 World Championship in France, where the French team placed fifth, her performance was recognized again, and she was selected a member of the All-Star Team together with her Ikast teammates Gro Hammerseng and Katja Nyberg. She competed at the 2008 Summer Olympics in Beijing, where the French team finished fifth, and she ranked shared second on the Top Goalkeepers list with a 40% save rate.

Honours

Results 
 Champions League
 Winner: 2006
 EHF Cup
 Winner: 2004
 Cup Winners' Cup
 Winner: 2003
 French Championship
 Winner: 1998, 2001, 2003
 French Cup
 Winner: 2001, 2002, 2003
 Danish Championship
 Gold: 2004, 2006
 Silver: 2007, 2008
 Danish Cup
 Winner: 2004/05, 2006/07

Awards 
 MVP and member of the All Star Team of the 2003 World Championship
 Member of the All Star Team of the 2007 World Championship

References

1975 births
Living people
French female handball players
Handball players at the 2000 Summer Olympics
Handball players at the 2004 Summer Olympics
Handball players at the 2008 Summer Olympics
Olympic handball players of France
Viborg HK players